Mohammed Hammad (born September 3, 1989 in Iraq) is an Iraqi footballer. He currently plays for Al-Nawair in Syria.

External links
Profile on Goalzz.com

1989 births
Iraqi footballers
Iraqi expatriate footballers
Living people
Expatriate footballers in Syria
Association football forwards
Syrian Premier League players